Vanka may refer to:

A diminutive form of the name Ivan
"Vanka" (short story), a story by Anton Chekhov
A character from the show Monster Warriors